Fudbalski klub Mladost Doboj Kakanj, commonly referred to as simply Mladost, is a professional association football club from the village of Doboj near the town of Kakanj that is situated in central Bosnia and Herzegovina.

The club currently plays in the First League of the Federation of Bosnia and Herzegovina and plays its home matches on the MGM Farm Arena in Doboj (Kakanj), which has a capacity of 3,000 seats.

History
The club was founded in 1959, on the foundations of FK Doboj, which was founded in 1956 and played in the league of the labour sports games of Kakanj.

In the 2009–10 season, the club was first in the League of the Zenica-Doboj Canton and was promoted to the Second League of FBIH (Group Center), where they finished in 4th place in the first season. The club played in the first round of the Bosnian Cup in the 2008–09 season. In 2013, Mladost finished in first place in the Second League of FBIH (Group Center) and were promoted to the First League of FBiH.

In the 2014–15 season of the First League of FBIH, the club finished 1st and earned itself promotion to the Bosnian Premier League.

Mladost's so far biggest ever success came in the 2016–17 season, when the club made it all the way to the semi-final of the 2016–17 Bosnia and Herzegovina Football Cup. On their way to the semi-final, Mladost eliminated Rudar Prijedor, Slavija Sarajevo and Bosna Union (at that time still known as Bosna Sema), before getting eliminated by Sarajevo in the semi-final.

In the 2020–21 Premier League season, Mladost initially avoided relegation to the First League of FBiH, but were then relegated back to the league due to failing to obtain a license for the Premier League.

Honours

Domestic

League
First League of the Federation of Bosnia and Herzegovina:
Winners (1): 2014–15
Second League of the Federation of Bosnia and Herzegovina:
Winners (1): 2012–13 
League of Zenica-Doboj Canton:
Winners (1): 2009–10

Cups
Bosnia and Herzegovina Cup:
Semi-finalists (1): 2016–17

Players

Current squad

Club officials

Coaching staff
{|
|valign="top"|

Other information

Managerial history
 Elvedin Beganović (9 July 2013 – 17 April 2014)
 Nijaz Kapo (17 April 2014 – 14 June 2015)
 Ibrahim Rahimić (14 June 2015 – 26 September 2016)
 Husref Musemić (27 September 2016 – 1 June 2017)
 Edis Mulalić (11 June 2017 – 8 April 2018)
 Nermin Šabić (11 April 2018 – 16 August 2018)
 Adnan Zildžović (17 August 2018 – 8 April 2019)
 Elvedin Beganović (8 April 2019 – 10 September 2019)
 Ibrahim Rahimić (10 September 2019 – 27 November 2019)
 Fahrudin Šolbić (27 November 2019 – 1 August 2020)
 Elvedin Beganović (interim) (1 August 2020 – 24 August 2020)
 Nemanja Miljanović (24 August 2020 – 30 June 2021)
 Dragan Radović (7 July 2021 – 21 November 2021)
 Eldin Čengić (24 January 2022 – Present)

Notes

References

External links
FK Mladost Doboj Kakanj at Facebook
FK Mladost Doboj Kakanj at UEFA

 
FK Mladost Doboj Kakanj
Kakanj
FK Mladost Doboj Kakanj
Football clubs in Bosnia and Herzegovina